Peter Paul "Paulie Walnuts" Gualtieri is a fictional character portrayed by Tony Sirico on the HBO series The Sopranos, one of the chief henchmen of series protagonist Tony Soprano. Sirico originally auditioned for the role of Uncle Junior with Frank Vincent, but Dominic Chianese landed the role. David Chase instead offered him the role of playing Paulie Gualtieri, Sirico agreed under the condition that his character would not "become a rat." Paulie begins the series as a soldier, later becoming a caporegime in the DiMeo crime family. He is violent, impulsive, and paranoid. Billy Magnussen portrays a young Paulie Gualtieri in the 2021 prequel film, The Many Saints of Newark.

Background 
According to The Sopranos: A Family History, Peter Paul "Paulie" Gualtieri, son of Gennaro Gualtieri (although Paulie's biological father was later revealed to be a World War II soldier named "Russ"), had been a troubled street kid in Roseville, Newark from the age of nine. He dropped out of school after the ninth grade and spent time in and out of juvenile correctional facilities during his early youth. Carmine Lupertazzi Sr. recalls that Paulie's presumed adopted father Gennaro was run over by a trolley. When he was seventeen, he officially became an enforcer/bodyguard for Johnny Soprano. He later moved to West Orange, New Jersey as an adult.

Paulie's presumed father was a captain in the DiMeo crime family. His mother, later discovered to be his biological aunt, worked at a Kresge's department store during Paulie's childhood and early adulthood, but has since retired. Paulie's grandfather, who emigrated to the United States in 1910, is from Ariano, a municipality in the province of Avellino, in Italy's Campania region. Paulie's grandfather and Tony's paternal grandparents were from the same province in Italy.

Paulie spent four years in the U.S. Army Signal Corps, where he was eventually drummed out through Section 8 (discharged because of psychiatric reasons). Afterward, he spent more time in and out of prison on various criminal charges. He eventually was inducted into the DiMeo crime family, becoming a close associate of Johnny Soprano and helping to mentor his son Tony.

His surname is taken from real-life DeCavalcante crime family mobster Frank Gualtieri, who served under Vincent Palermo. In the episode "From Where to Eternity", Paulie mentions to his parish priest after visiting a psychic that he had been donating to the parish for 23 years, meaning he had started donating in 1977. He helped pay for refurbishing his church's organ and paid for the new altar boy robes. He tells the priest he will stop contributing financially to the church following his incident with the psychic saying that he should have been protected.

Paulie is one of the show's most colorful characters, often cracking jokes or spouting bizarre sentiments. He is self-centered, opinionated, does not show much empathy, and can be paranoid at times. One of the older active gangsters in the family, Paulie adheres to traditional mob customs and ultimately shows loyalty and deference to his boss Tony. Other character traits include his competitiveness, miserly nature, germaphobia, and indifference to violence.

Despite his seniority and successful earning, Paulie is one of the more eccentric and reckless of Tony's associates and is arguably the most ruthless. In the first season finale, "I Dream of Jeannie Cusamano," Tony tells his crew that he had been in therapy for almost a year when Paulie reveals that he too had seen a therapist, from whom he "learned some coping skills." Nevertheless, despite his personality flaws, Paulie is recognized throughout the series as one of the top earners and one of Tony's most trusted friends in his "inner circle". Although he is shown to be dating a couple of different women during the series, Paulie has no children and mostly remains single, devoting almost his entire life to being a gangster.

Plot details

Season 1 
In the first season, Paulie is a central member of Tony's crew. He executes a Colombian drug dealer and steals a large quantity of drugs and cash from his hotel room. Other tasks he performs are retrieving a stolen car (with Salvatore "Big Pussy" Bonpensiero), torturing a hotel co-owner so the crew can own 25% of the business, and extorting a soccer coach by giving him an unwanted free TV. When suspicions that Big Pussy is an informant first surface, Paulie volunteers to investigate (and murder if necessary). His method of taking Pussy to a bath house and trying to get him to undress for a steambath lacks subtlety and drives Pussy into hiding. In Tony's brief and bloody war with Corrado "Junior" Soprano's crew, following Junior's attempt on Tony's life, Paulie is assigned the hit on Junior's consigliere Mikey Palmice, with Christopher Moltisanti.

Season 2 
In season two, when Tony becomes the family's street boss, while Junior remains boss only in name, Paulie is promoted to capo of Tony's old crew. This meant that Pussy, Chris, and Furio Giunta amongst others, report to him. To help set up the crew's stolen car distribution operation, Paulie travels with Tony and Chris to Italy. Paulie also helps run the "executive game," a high-stakes poker game. In the episode "From Where to Eternity", Chris is in the hospital recovering from the bullet wounds caused by Matthew Bevilaqua and Sean Gismonte's failed assassination attempt. Chris becomes clinically dead for a few minutes after his heart stops.  While in his comatose state, he has a morphine-induced dream in which he visits Hell and sees his deceased father "Dickie" Moltisanti his deceased former best friend Brendan Filone and Mikey Palmice, who had slain Brendan. Chris informs Tony and Paulie that Mikey had a message for them: "Three o'clock".

Paulie subsequently begins to have nightmares of being dragged to Hell. At the recommendation of his mistress, Pauline goes to see a medium in Nyack, New York. Much to Paulie's chagrin, the authenticity of the medium seems to be confirmed when he apparently begins communicating with people that Paulie has killed, with Mikey apparently giving details of his murder. Paulie remains unsettled and paranoid, as he also feels he is being haunted by Palmice and others he had murdered throughout his criminal life. However, a skeptical Tony informs him that it means nothing. Later in the season, when it is confirmed that Pussy was an informant for the FBI, Paulie accompanies Tony and Silvio Dante on their trip out on a boat to execute Pussy.  Right before the execution is carried out, Paulie tells Pussy "you were like a brother to me," at which point Tony adds, "to all of us."

Season 3 
In the third season, Chris often chafes under Paulie's leadership, particularly after Chris becomes a made man in Paulie's crew. Paulie becomes more demanding of his regular payments and subjects Chris to a humiliating random strip search for wires. Things get heated when Paulie and Patsy Parisi show up unexpectedly at Christopher's apartment to get a take of Chris's loot. While meddling through a dresser drawer, Chris observes Paulie sniffing Adriana's panties, about which he later complains to Tony, who chides Paulie.

The tensions between Paulie and Chris culminate in "Pine Barrens" when Tony assigns Paulie and Chris the task of collecting a payment owed to Silvio by a Russian mobster named Valery. They botch the simple assignment after they get into a fight with Valery at his apartment. Believing Valery is dead after Paulie chokes him with a lamp, they take Valery out into the Pine Barrens to dispose of him. Valery, who is later revealed to be a former Russian military commando, is still alive and knocks both Paulie and Chris to the ground with a shovel. He escapes and leads Paulie and Chris on a brief chase in the woods. 

Paulie shoots Valery in the head. He and Chris are unable to find the seemingly mortally wounded Valery, and the two are dumbfounded as to what happened to him. Paulie and Chris look for him in the woods, but they lose their way. They become hungry, extremely cold, tired, and frustrated with each other. Later, a heated exchange prompts Chris to pull his gun and threaten to kill Paulie. The next morning, they are rescued by Tony and Bobby Baccalieri, with Tony disappointed at Paulie's failure to complete such an easy task.

Season 4 
Between the third and fourth seasons, Paulie is arrested in Youngstown, Ohio on a gun possession charge and incarcerated at the Northeast Ohio Correctional Center. Although no censure was rendered upon him, Paulie's separation from the family, combined with Ralphie's continued earning abilities, continues to erode his reputation and credibility in Tony's eyes.

During his four months in jail, he communicates with John "Johnny Sack" Sacramoni, the underboss of New York's Lupertazzi crime family, while under the false impression that he could earn a place with them. It is Paulie who tells Johnny Sack that Ralph Cifaretto made a very insensitive joke regarding Ginny Sack's weight, which compels an infuriated Johnny to sanction a hit on Ralph that is called off at the last minute.

A party is thrown at the Bada Bing when Paulie is released, but his wavering loyalty only serves to accelerate his marginalization. Paulie, however, by the end of the season, realizes he had been duped by Johnny Sack and that Carmine Lupertazzi had never even heard of him, much less offered him a place in his New York family. Following this realization, Paulie once again devotes himself fully to Tony and the Soprano family, reclaiming his status as a top earner.

Paulie has always been devoted to his mother, Marianucci "Nucci" Gualtieri, whom he has watched over constantly. She is delighted when he first places her at Green Grove (in stark contrast to Livia Soprano's reaction), and Paulie also intercedes in her social problems with the other residents, going so far as to attack their relatives to ensure civility for his mother.

He later learns that one of the women Nucci had trouble with, Minn Matrone, keeps all her cash in her home. Paulie breaks into Minn's home to try to steal this money, but she catches him in the act. When he fails to talk his way out of it, he suffocates her with a pillow. He gives the money to Tony, which rejuvenates his confidence in Paulie.

Season 5 
In the fifth season, Chris and Paulie's bad blood resurfaces when Chris reiterates the story of the Pine Barrens incident to Vito Spatafore, Patsy Parisi, and Benny Fazio. The story starts out friendly, but after Chris embarrasses him in front of the guys, Paulie calls Chris "Tony's little favorite."

This leads to Chris and Paulie almost starting a fight and later, Paulie tells the rest of the guys that it's over between the two of them. At comare night, Chris refuses to pay for dinner, forcing Paulie to pay. At Satriale's the following morning, Paulie demands the money back, or else Chris would begin paying points. At another dinner in Atlantic City, Paulie tells everyone to choose whatever they want in order to inflate Christopher's bill. Tapped out, Chris leaves a small tip and argues with Paulie in the parking lot until the waiter comes out to confront them.

Chris responds violently and throws a brick at him. The waiter collapses and goes into convulsions. Panicked, Paulie shoots the waiter and retrieves the $1,200 in cash before running away. Paulie later calls Chris and they agreed to "bury the hatchet," and split the tab. While this seems to Chris like a fair compromise, it essentially means that Paulie is profiting from the whole situation by only returning half of the cash he stole from the dead waiter.

Paulie also gets into a dispute with Michele "Feech" La Manna over their rival landscaping companies. Paulie and Feech both resort to violence, assaulting the other's gardeners. Paulie's competition with and antagonism of Feech serves to highlight Feech's insubordinate tendencies, which cause Tony to "set up" Feech for a return to prison, making it easier for everyone.

Season 6

Part I 
Between the fifth and sixth seasons, Chris is made Capo of Paulie's crew, with Paulie being elevated to underboss, albeit a nominal one. Paulie's reputation for withholding money from his payments "up the ladder" is observed in "Mayham." While Tony is in a coma, Paulie takes part in a heist with Vito Spatafore that leads to a score of $1 million in Colombian drug money, which is to be divided up fairly in terms of percentage amongst Tony, Paulie, and Vito.

The heist resulted from a tip by Vito. Although they had agreed to split the acquisition, Paulie later tries to withhold some of Vito's share due to an injury he had received during the heist; Silvio has to mediate as acting boss, informing them that under the circumstances, Tony's share would be given to Carmela. Vito and Paulie are strongly reluctant to give Tony's share to Carmela, as they speculated Tony could potentially die at any moment but in the end accept.

When Vito's homosexuality is later revealed, Paulie is outspoken in his condemnation and desire to see Vito killed. When Vito returns after months in hiding, Tony considers his proposal of setting up business in Atlantic City with Silvio in front of Paulie; Paulie remains quiet but leaves the room in apparent protest. Tony largely decides to have Vito killed because Paulie's attitude mirrors the lack of respect his underlings would feel for him letting Vito live free, although Phil Leotardo makes it a moot point when members of his family beat Vito to death.

In "The Fleshy Part of the Thigh," Paulie learns that his dying aunt Dotty, a Sisters of Christian Charity nun, was actually his mother. She had become impregnated by a soldier identified only as "Russ" during World War II. Nucci, the woman Paulie had thought of as his mother, is really his aunt who took him in as her own to hide the scandal. This news sends Paulie into an emotional tailspin, in the grips of which he severed his ties with Nucci and does not attend Dotty's funeral.

The episode ends with Paulie extorting $4,000 per month (the sum of Nucci's retirement home costs) from Jason Barone, the son of the late owner of the Barone Sanitation company, unbeknownst to Tony. Earlier, Paulie had witnessed Helen Barone meet with Tony to intercede on her son's behalf, and Tony promised that he would not be harmed; hearing this conversation leads Paulie to break down emotionally. This means that Little Paulie Germani is not his nephew, but his first cousin once removed, although he still refers to Little Paulie as his nephew.

In "The Ride", Paulie is responsible for organizing the annual festivities at the Feast of St. Elzear. Paulie had taken over running the festival from Johnny Boy Soprano upon his death and continues to try to run it for profit. In 2006, it proves a burden—the replacement priest, Father José, tries to renegotiate the payment the church would receive. Paulie refuses to pay, and Father José retaliates by refusing to allow St. Elzear's gold hat to be used in the festival.

The hat's absence is noticed and complained about by elder residents. Ride maintenance is another area where Paulie decides to save money, which results in a malfunction while Bobby Baccalieri's family was on a ride. Janice receives minor neck injuries. Subsequently, this results in temporary bad blood between Paulie and Bobby which Tony orders to be resolved.

During the festival, Paulie is tested for prostate cancer because of an elevated PSA. With his recently unveiled uncertain parentage, there is no way of knowing if he was genetically predisposed to the disease or not. During a restless night awaiting his results, Paulie awakes at 3 a.m. and goes to the Bada Bing. There, he has a striking vision of the Virgin Mary hovering above the stage.

Paulie later visits Nucci at Green Grove, and they have a silent reconciliation. In "Moe N' Joe," Paulie tells Tony that he has been diagnosed with prostate cancer. The disease was apparently caught in an early stage, and Paulie undergoes radiation therapy. Paulie suggests that his luck at having been diagnosed early was a reward for good deeds in his life, and Tony agrees with him. He states in "Stage 5," that he beat cancer, after learning of Johnny Sack's death from lung cancer.

Part II 
In "Remember When", Paulie and Tony leave for Miami to lie low while the FBI investigates the case of Tony's first murder victim, Willie Overall. On the trip and in Miami, Paulie begins to reminisce about his and Tony's youth, bringing up several violent incidents from their mutual past; Tony briefly contemplates killing him out of a fear that Paulie will inadvertently implicate one or both of them in a crime, but ultimately relents.

In "Walk Like a Man", Paulie's nephew, Little Paulie, is beaten by Chris and thrown out a second-story window. A furious Paulie tears up Christopher's lawn with his car, leaving Christopher's wife shaken.

Later in the episode, the two seem to have made up and drink together at the Bada Bing. However, Paulie makes off-color remarks about Christopher's daughter, which cause an inebriated Chris to storm out and later kill his AA friend J.T. Dolan. In "Kennedy and Heidi", Paulie is left surprisingly grief-stricken when Chris is killed, reflecting that their arguments over money and respect were trivial and that he should have been nicer to him in life.

Paulie is later "upstaged" when his aunt/adopted mother Nucci dies and her wake is under-attended because his friends are at Christopher's wake instead. In the final episode "Made in America", Tony asks Paulie to take over the old Aprile crew. At first, Paulie is hesitant because all the bad luck that had befallen that crew's previous capos, but changes his mind after clever persuasion from Tony. With an ongoing war between the New Jersey and New York crime families, Tony and Paulie attend a sit-down with the New York crew, who agree to a truce to end their war. Paulie is last seen on his own outside Satriale's, as the resident cat is nearby.

Gualtieri crew 

When given control of the Soprano crew, Paulie oversees all of Tony's old business dealings, including the Paving Union, extorting drug dealers, the pump and dump scams, charging HMOs for fake MRI expenditures, fencing stolen cars, a phone card scam, gambling, loan sharking and the crew's front businesses: Barone Sanitation and Massarone Construction.

Throughout the series, other aspects of the crew's criminal activities develop or are revealed. These include control of the Joint Fitters Union, credit card hijacking, betting shops, cigarette smuggling, and protection rackets. Legitimate businesses include Pussy's auto body shop (now run by his wife Angie), and silent partner in a lawn care business. Paulie soon becomes Tony's biggest earner.

However, by the fourth season, Paulie's businesses hit a low point, especially in comparison to the Cifaretto and Barese crews. By the fifth season, Paulie's crew regains its position as one of the family's best earners. By the sixth season, Paulie's crew is one of the most powerful crews. However, prior to the beginning of season six Christopher Moltisanti is promoted to captain splitting off from Paulie's crew with the younger soldiers and associates. After Christopher's death, the soldiers and associates in his crew are transferred back to Paulie's crew.

Murder victims 
The following is a list of murders committed by or referenced to in the series by Paulie. He is depicted killing nine people, the largest total of any character on the show.

Family tree

 In "Commendatori," when Paulie still believes that Nucci is his mother, he mentions having two brothers and a sister. Only Gerry and Rose are mentioned by name in the series; one of the brothers is a doctor.
 In the series finale, Tony mentions a niece of Paulie's who has MS. Because it now is known that Paulie has no siblings, he is referring to one of his cousin's/"siblings'" children.

Appearances in other media 
Paulie appeared in a commercial for Aftonbladet, advertising that the tabloid was being sold with a free Sopranos DVD each week in 2009.

References

External links 
 http://www.hbo.com/sopranos/cast/character/paulie_walnuts.shtml
 http://www.hbo.com/sopranos/fbifiles/paulie_walnuts.shtml

American male characters in television
Adoptee characters in television
Fictional assassins
Fictional bodyguards
Fictional boxers
Fictional capos
Fictional characters from New Jersey
Fictional characters with cancer
Fictional gangsters
Fictional LSD users
Fictional murderers
Fictional Italian American people
Fictional underbosses
Fictional United States Army personnel
Male characters in film
Male villains
The Sopranos characters
Television characters introduced in 1999
Film characters introduced in 2021